The 2016–17 Stephen F. Austin Lumberjacks basketball team represented Stephen F. Austin State University during the 2016–17 NCAA Division I men's basketball season. The Lumberjacks were led by first-year head coach Kyle Keller and played their home games at the William R. Johnson Coliseum as members of the Southland Conference. They finished the season 18–18, 12–6 in Southland play to finish in a three-way tie for second place. They defeated Lamar in the quarterfinals of the Southland tournament to advance to the Semifinals where they lost to Texas A&M–Corpus Christi. They were invited to the CollegeInsider.com Tournament where they lost in the first round to Idaho.

On May 20, 2020, following the discovery of an administrative error in certifying eligibility for student-athletes, Stephen F. Austin reached an agreement with the NCAA to vacate hundreds of wins across multiple sports from 2013 to 2019, including all 117 men's basketball wins from the 2014–15 to 2018–19 seasons.

Previous season
The Lumberjacks finished the 2015–16 season with a record of 28–6, 18–0 in Southland play to win the regular season championship. They won the Southland tournament championship to earn the conference's automatic bid to the NCAA tournament. As a No. 14 seed, they upset No. 3-ranked West Virginia in the first round before losing in the final seconds to Notre Dame in the second round.

On March 21, 2016, head coach Brad Underwood left the school and was named the head coach at Oklahoma State. On April 4, 2016, Kyle Keller was named head coach.

Roster

Schedule and results

|-
!colspan=9 style=| Exhibition

|-
!colspan=9 style=| Non-conference regular season

|-
!colspan=9 style=|Southland Conference regular season

|-
!colspan=9 !colspan=9 style=| Southland Conference tournament

|-
!colspan=9 !colspan=9 style=| CIT

See also
2016–17 Stephen F. Austin Ladyjacks basketball team
List of vacated and forfeited games in college basketball

References

Stephen F. Austin Lumberjacks basketball seasons
Stephen F. Austin
Stephen F. Austin
Stephen F. Austin Lumberjacks basketball
Stephen F. Austin Lumberjacks basketball